Project Ploughshares is a Canadian non-government organization which works to advance policies and actions to prevent war and armed violence and build peace located in the Centre for Peace Advancement at Conrad Grebel University College in Waterloo, Ontario.

History 
Ploughshares was founded in 1976 by Ernie Regehr and Murray Thomson to promote peace by drawing attention to the increasing development and flow of weapons. The organization was located at Conrad Grebel College in Waterloo, Ontario, Canada. In mid-1977 it became a project of the Canadian Council of Churches. Project Ploughshares is also affiliated with the Institute of Peace and Conflict Studies at Conrad Grebel University College.
Project Ploughshares takes its name from Isaiah 2:4 where it is written "God shall judge between the nations, and shall decide for many peoples; and they shall beat their swords into ploughshares, and spears into pruning hooks; nation shall not lift up sword against nation; neither shall they learn war any more."

Current programs 

Currently, Project Ploughshares has programs focusing on the following five areas:

Nuclear weapons

Space security 
The Space Security Index is a research partnership between several academic, governmental, and non-governmental organizations. Partners include the Institute of Air and Space Law at McGill University, the Secure World Foundation, Project Ploughshares, and The Simons Foundation, in cooperation with the International Security Research and Outreach Programme of Foreign Affairs and International Trade Canada
publishes an annual report called the Space Security Index. It is the first and only annual, comprehensive and integrated assessment of space security. The project seeks to provide a policy-neutral fact base of trends and developments in space security based on primary, open-source research in an annual report. The objective is to facilitate dialogue on space security challenges and potential responses by providing the necessary facts and focus to inform an important debate that has become unnecessarily polarized. The project produces an annual report on trends and developments in space.

Conventional weapons 
Project Ploughshares monitors and reports on Canadian military production and exports.
In support of this work, they maintain the Canadian Military Industry Database which compiles publicly available records of military contracts awarded to Canadian companies as well as annual government records of arms exports to overseas countries.

Project Ploughshares is a member organization of the International Action Network on Small Arms, and the Control Arms coalition.

Defence and human security

Armed conflicts 
Since 1987, Project Ploughshares has been monitoring armed conflicts worldwide. The information is published annually as the Armed Conflicts Report, analysing trends in armed conflict, political developments, status of the fighting and the number of deaths. In the 2020 publication of Killer Optics: Exports of Wescam Sensors to Turkey – a Litmus Test of Canada’s Compliance with the Arms Trade Treaty. the organization highlighted areas where the Canadian arms export laws and its treaty obligations were violated by an improper evaluation of the "substantial risk" that international human rights law or security violations could occur by the transfer of the advanced weaponry.

Local groups 
A network of local Ploughshares groups promote the work of Project Ploughshares at the community level across Canada. Currently, there are local groups in: Langley, Calgary, Edmonton, Saskatoon, Winnipeg, St. Catharines, Peterborough, Ottawa, Hamilton and Montreal.

Publications

Since 1977, Project Ploughshares has been publishing the Ploughshares Monitor, a quarterly journal. Since 2011, Project Ploughshares also publishes a blog.

References

Peace organizations based in Canada
Organizations established in 1976